Royalist was launched in 1794 at Sunderland. She was a general trader until 1812 when she became a whaler in the northern whale fishery. She was lost in April 1814 while whaling in the Davis Strait.

Career
Royalist first appeared in Lloyd's Register (LR) in 1795 with Robert Finley, master, H.Rudd, owner, and trade London–Hamburg.

In 1812 Royalist became a Northern Whale Fishery whaler. The following data is from Coltish:

Fate
Lloyd's List (LL) reported in August 1814 that Royalist had foundered in the Davis Strait with the loss of all hands. There had been 54 crew members on board.

Three years later one of her casks washed ashore at Hoy Sound.

Captain Benet, of Venerable had been in company before Royalist was lost. At 8a.m. on the 14th, they fell in with drift ice. A gale of 12 hours duration developed, followed by a tremendous storm of 20 hours duration. Royalist and venerable separated; Captain Bennet believed that she had been lost to windward of some icebergs.

Citations

References
 
 
 

1794 ships
Ships built on the River Wear
Age of Sail merchant ships of England
Whaling ships
Maritime incidents in 1814
Ships lost with all hands